Battle of Reims (also Battle of Rheims) may refer to:
 Battle of Reims (356), between the Roman army and the Alemanni.
 Battle of Reims (1814), between French forces under Napoleon and a Russian-Prussian force.
 Battle of Reims (1918), between Germany and the allied forces during World War I.